Paolo Cognetti (Milan, 27 January 1978) is an Italian writer.
He started studying mathematics at university, but quit to enroll at Milan's film-making school Civica Scuola di Cinema «Luchino Visconti», where he graduated in 1999. He taught himself American literature and started directing documentaries in 2004, especially about social, political and literary topics. His first work as a writer was the short story Fare ordine, which won the Premio Subway−Letteratura. He loves New York City, which has become the main subject of some of his documentaries. His other passion is the mountains, where he likes to spend a few months alone every year. In 2016, he published his first novel Le otto montagne (The Eight Mountains, English translation by Simon Carnell and Erica Segre for Atria Books, 2018), which granted him the Premio Strega 2017, Italy′s most prestigious literary award, as well as various international awards, such as the Prix Médicis étranger, the Prix François Sommer, and the English Pen Translates Award.

Works 
Fare ordine. [Genere: storia d'amore; 1 racconto da 5 fermate], Milan, 2003
 Manuale per ragazze di successo, Rome, 2004
 Una cosa piccola che sta per esplodere, Rome, 2007
 Sofia si veste sempre di nero, Rome, 2012
Il nuotatore, with Mara Cerri, Rome, 2013
 Le otto montagne (The Eight Mountains),Turin , 2016
La felicità del Lupo,Turin, Einaudi, 2021

Documentaries
Scrivere/New York, 2004

Essay
 New York è una finestra senza tende, 2010
 Il ragazzo selvatico. Quaderno di montagna, Milan, 2013
 A pesca nelle pozze più profonde , Roma, 2014
 Tutte le mie preghiere guardano verso ovest,2014
Senza mai arrivare in cima,,Turin, Einaudi, 2018
L'Antonia. Poesie, lettere e fotografie di Antonia Pozzi scelte e raccontate da Paolo Cognetti, Milan, Ponte alle Grazie, 2021.

References

External links
Sito casa editrice minimum fax, scheda di Paolo Cognetti.

1978 births
Living people
Writers from Milan
21st-century Italian male writers
21st-century Italian novelists
Strega Prize winners
Italian male novelists
Prix Médicis étranger winners